The Empress of Salt and Fortune is a 2020 fantasy novella by Nghi Vo. It is the first book of the Singing Hills Cycle and was followed by a sequel, When the Tiger Came Down the Mountain, in 2021. The plot focuses on a cleric who listens to stories about the recently deceased empress. It won the 2021 Hugo Award for Best Novella and was nominated for the 2021 Locus Award for Best Novella.

Plot

Cleric Chih of the Singing Hills Monastery visits an abandoned palace, Thriving Fortune, after the death of the Empress. They are accompanied by a talking hoopoe named Almost Brilliant. They meet Rabbit, an elderly woman who was once the Empress’s servant. She tells Chih about Empress In-yo’s life as they catalogue the contents of the palace.

In-yo is a northern princess married to the Emperor of Pines and Steel for diplomatic purposes. The emperor has her sterilized and banished. In-yo secretly communicates with her kin in the north, hoping for revenge. She stages a pilgrimage, an excuse for leaving her exile in Thriving Fortune. Her caravan of pilgrims is infiltrated by northern warriors, allowing her to escape Empire custody. In-yo’s servant Sukai, Rabbit’s lover, is executed. Rabbit gives birth to Sukai’s daughter; In-yo presents the daughter as her own. She leads an army to the capital, the Emperor is killed, and In-yo takes the throne. She has recently passed away and has been succeeded by Rabbit's daughter. Rabbit disappears, and Chih leaves Thriving Fortune to attend the coronation of the new Empress.

Major themes

The novel subverts the reader's expectations regarding the importance of "side characters" and the "protagonist". Although In-yo might be considered the protagonist because her actions move the plot forward, Rabbit's life story is given equal prominence. Though she is a peasant girl, her relationship with the empress provides an emotional core to the novella. The novella also explores disenfranchisement, oppression, and classism. Rabbit never shares her given name, and much of her background remains a mystery. Additionally, her relationship with In-yo is complicated by their disparate wealth and social status. Chih records others' stories but not their own.

Style

The story of In-yo is relayed to Chih by Rabbit, an unreliable narrator. Because Rabbit has her own motivations which are revealed through the story, the reader must determine if she is leaving anything out.

The worldbuilding of the story meshes elements from various real-life Asian cultures and languages, including China and Vietnam.

Reception

The novel received critical praise. It was nominated for the 2021 Locus Award for Best Novella and won the 2021 Hugo Award for Best Novella.

Publishers Weekly gave the novella a starred review, calling it a "masterfully told story... sure to impress". An NPR review called it "a remarkable accomplishment of storytelling", praising the way in which it amplifies the voices of women as well as queer characters, including the non-binary cleric Chih. A reviewer for Medium praised the exploration of stories, storytelling, and female companionship. The novella also received praise for its layered narrative structure, in which Chih, Rabbit, and In-yo all dole out different pieces of the story. Reviewers have lauded the novel's female characters, the way in which women fight against their patriarchal society, and the "lyrical" and "haunting" prose.

A reviewer from DVAN praised Vo for her evocative writing style and strong characterization, but felt that the worldbuilding and magic system were weak.

References

2020 fantasy novels
LGBT speculative fiction novels
Vietnamese-American novels
2020s LGBT novels